New Year (Chinese: 過年) is a black-and-white Chinese animation made in 1924 by Cy Young.

History
It is a cartoon short produced under the "Shanghai Tobacco Company" (上海菸草公司). The clip was an advertisement. It is very likely that the company was actually the British American Tobacco Company given the time frame and location.

See also
History of Chinese animation
Chinese animation

References

External links
 China Movie DB

Chinese animated short films
1924 films
1924 animated films
1920s animated short films
Chinese silent films
Chinese black-and-white films